Duvall is an unincorporated community in the town of Red River, Kewaunee County, Wisconsin, United States.

History

The church of St. Frances DePaul was founded 1858, and landed deeded in 1860 by Louis Marchant. The community was initally called Marchant because services were held in the Marchant family home until a church was built.

The formal name came in 1890 when the post office was established named for Joseph Duvall, a prominent Kewaunee businessman and civic benefactor, who also served as postmaster.

References

Unincorporated communities in Kewaunee County, Wisconsin
Unincorporated communities in Wisconsin